Strigoptera is a genus of "jewel beetles" in the subfamily Polycestinae and tribe Polycestini.

Species
Strigoptera includes the following:

 Strigoptera auromaculata (Saunders, 1867)
 Strigoptera bettoni (Waterhouse, 1904)
 Strigoptera bimaculata (Linnaeus, 1758)
 Strigoptera borneensis (Obenberger, 1924)
 Strigoptera cyanipennis (Deyrolle, 1864)
 Strigoptera fairmairei (Waterhouse, 1904)
 Strigoptera kubani Bellamy, 2006
 Strigoptera obsoleta (Chevrolat, 1841)
 Strigoptera pulchra (Waterhouse, 1904)
 Strigoptera rubripennis (Thery, 1923)
 Strigoptera socotra Zabransky, 2005

References

Buprestidae genera